Vincent Sarnelli (born 24 February 1962) is a French boxer. He competed in the men's middleweight event at the 1984 Summer Olympics. At the 1984 Summer Olympics, he lost to Moses Mwaba of Zambia.

References

1962 births
Living people
French male boxers
Olympic boxers of France
Boxers at the 1984 Summer Olympics
Place of birth missing (living people)
Middleweight boxers